"Lost in the Sun" is a song by American indie rock band Ivy. It was released as the third and final single from their sixth studio album, All Hours (2011). It was issued in the United States on April 10, 2012 as a digital download by Nettwerk and Unfiltered Records. The single was written and produced by Adam Schlesinger and Andy Chase.

Background and composition 
In Matt Collar's AllMusic description of the track, he stated that it is a "more detached electronica" song with "a slick if still airy mix of melodic guitar pop".

Critical reception 
"Lost in the Sun" received mixed to positive reviews from critics. John Bergstrom of PopMatters enjoyed "Lost in the Sun", but preferred Ivy's "World Without You" more.

Music video 
A music video for the song was filmed in early 2012 and released on August 23, 2012. The video shows singer Dominique Durand lounging on the beach while singing the song.

Track listings and formats

Credits and personnel 
Credits and personnel adapted from All Hours liner notes and Ivy's AllMusic discography.

Personnel

 Andy Chase – engineering, executive producer, mixing
 Ruddy Cullers – engineering
 Bruce Driscoll – programming
 Dominique Durand – lead and background vocals
 Philippe Garcia – photography

 Josh Grier – legal advisor
 Brian Hill – art direction, design
 Ted Jensen – mastering
 Atsuo Matsumoto – assistant mixing
 Adam Schlesinger – engineering, executive producer, mixing

Release history

References 

2011 songs
2012 singles
Ivy (band) songs
Nettwerk Records singles
Songs written by Adam Schlesinger
Songs written by Andy Chase